Sambucus gaudichaudiana, commonly known as white elderberry, is a species of flowering plant in the family Adoxaceae and is endemic to eastern Australia. It is a perennial shrub but with stems that are produced annually with pinnate leaves that have three to eleven leaflets, small white flowers and small but edible fruit. It grows in cool forest and shady gorges.

Description

Taxonomy
Sambucus gaudichaudiana was first formally described in 1830 by de Candolle in his book Prodromus Systematis Naturalis Regni Vegetabilis.

Distribution and habitat
White elderberry mainly grows in forest, usually in moist or shady sites in south-eastern Queensland, eastern New South Wales as far west as Warren, the Australian Capital Territory, the southern half of Victoria, in Tasmania and the far south-eastern corner of South Australia.

Use as food
The berries of S. gaudichaudiana are edible, juicy, slightly sour and pleasant and can be eaten raw or cooked.

References

gaudichaudiana
Asterids of Australia
Bushfood
Flora of Queensland
Flora of New South Wales
Flora of Victoria (Australia)
Flora of Tasmania
Flora of South Australia